John Betts (June 20, 1650June 1730)  was a member of the House of Representatives of the Colony of Connecticut from Norwalk in the sessions of October 1708, May 1709, October 1710, May 1715, and May 1716.

He was born June 20, 1650 in Guilford, which at the time was a part of the New Haven Colony. He was the son of Thomas Betts and Sarah Marvin.

References 

1650 births
1730 deaths
People from Guilford, Connecticut
People of colonial Connecticut
Members of the Connecticut House of Representatives
Politicians from Norwalk, Connecticut